In relational algebra, a selection (sometimes called a restriction in reference to E.F. Codd's 1970 paper and not,  contrary to a popular belief, to avoid confusion with SQL's use of SELECT, since Codd's article predates the existence of SQL) is a unary operation that denotes a subset of a relation.

A selection is written as
 or  where:
  is a binary operation in the set 
  is a value constant
  is a relation

More formally the semantics of the selection is defined as
follows:

 

 

The result of the selection is only defined if the attribute names that it mentions are in the heading of the relation that it operates upon.

Generalized selection

Formally the semantics of the generalized selection is defined as follows:

 

The result of the selection is only defined if the attribute names that it mentions are in the header of the relation that it operates upon.

The generalized selection is expressible with other basic algebraic operations. A simulation of generalized selection using the fundamental operators is defined by the following rules:

Computer languages
In computer languages it is expected that any truth-valued expression be permitted as the selection condition rather than restricting it to be a simple comparison.

In SQL, selections are performed by using WHERE definitions in SELECT, UPDATE, and DELETE statements, but note that the selection condition can result in any of three truth values (true, false and unknown) instead of the usual two.

In SQL, general selections are performed by using WHERE definitions with AND, OR, or NOT operands in SELECT, UPDATE, and DELETE statements.

References

External links
 http://cisnet.baruch.cuny.edu/holowczak/classes/3400/relationalalgebra/#selectionoperator

Relational algebra